Jormundgand is Helheim's debut full-length album, released in 1995. The limited LP version has alternative artwork. The CD version has a bonus track "Galder". Female vocals are performed by Mailin.

Track listing
All Lyrics By Vanargandr.  All Music As Noted.
"Jormundgand" – 7:48 (Hrimgrimnir)
"Vigrids Vård " – 8:16 (Vanargandr)
"Nidr ok Nordr liggr Helvegr" – 4:28 (Vanargandr)
"Gravlagt I Eljudne" – 8:47 (Hrimgrimnir)
"Svart Visdom" – 9:08 (Hrimgrimnir)
"Jotnevandring" – 2:27 (Hrymr)
"Nattravnens Tokt" - 5:10 (Vanargandr)
"Galder" – 3:16

Personnel

Helheim
Hrimgrimnir: guitars, vocal
Vanargandr: bass, vocals
Hrmyr: drums, percussion, keyboards, synthesizers, programming

Additional Musicians
Knut Futhark: Jew's harp
Thomas Krokeide: trumpet
Mailin: female vocals

References

Helheim (band) albums
1995 albums